is a micro-asteroid and a near-Earth object of the Aten group, approximately  in diameter. It was the first confirmed finding, detected on 5 February 2018, announced on 8 February 2018, of the Zwicky Transient Facility project, located at Palomar Observatory, California, in the United States.

References

External links 
 NASA Planetary Data System: 2018 CL
 
 
 

Minor planet object articles (unnumbered)

Near-Earth objects in 2018
20180205